Claude Angelo (11 November 1894 – 6 August 1981) was an Australian wrestler. He competed in the freestyle featherweight event at the 1924 Summer Olympics.

References

1894 births
1981 deaths
Olympic wrestlers of Australia
Wrestlers at the 1924 Summer Olympics
Australian male sport wrestlers
Sportspeople from Melbourne